The Dâmbu is a right tributary of the river Teleajen in Romania. It flows through the city Ploiești and the villages Băicoi, Păulești, Corlătești and Goga. It discharges into the Teleajen in Buchilași.

References

Rivers of Romania
Rivers of Prahova County